Full Frontal with Samantha Bee is an American late-night talk and news satire television program that aired on TBS from 2016 to 2022. The show was hosted by comedian Samantha Bee, a former correspondent on The Daily Show.

In July 2022, the show was cancelled following the Warner Bros. Discovery merger.

Production
Samantha Bee served as a correspondent on The Daily Show for 12 years, becoming its longest tenured correspondent. She was not approached about succeeding Jon Stewart as the show's host when Stewart announced he would leave the show. Bee and her husband, Jason Jones, pitched television shows to networks, and their scripted series, called The Detour, was picked up by TBS in February 2015. TBS then decided to extend their relationship with Bee to develop a late-night talk show to pair with Conan.

Bee hired Jo Miller and Miles Kahn, formerly producers on The Daily Show, as executive producers for her new show. They set up a blind process for hiring writers that hid the gender and experience level of the applicants, resulting in a writing staff that was approximately half female and 30% non-white. The show hired Winter Miller to help develop a mentorship program to help diversify the writing room.

Before the show's format was finalized, Bee indicated that she would have segments that focus on news headlines, field pieces, and "grab bag" segments. She filmed a segment about how the Veterans Health Administration was not prepared to treat female soldiers, and filmed a segment in Jordan. Showrunner Jo Miller indicated that the show would be more interested in injustice than in hypocrisy. There are no interview guests on the series, but a number of guest actors have appeared in various segments. For example, the May 9, 2016 episode featured both the singer Michelle Branch and comedian Patton Oswalt.

Full Frontal shared a studio with Last Week Tonight with John Oliver. Bee's offices previously housed Stephen Colbert and his staff while renovations were taking place at the Ed Sullivan Theater for The Late Show with Stephen Colbert. At the time of its debut, Full Frontal was the only late-night talk show airing in the United States which was hosted by a woman.

On October 31, 2016, Full Frontal aired an interview Bee conducted with President Barack Obama.

In January 2017, Bee announced that the show would be hosting a gala to counter the White House Correspondents' Dinner. The event, titled "Not the White House Correspondents’ Dinner", was held at DAR Constitution Hall in Washington, D.C. on April 29, 2017, and aired the same evening at 10:00 p.m. EST on TBS, followed by an encore uncensored broadcast at 11:00 p.m. on Twitter. The event raised $200,000 for the Committee to Protect Journalists (CPJ).

A portion of the proceeds from the show's merchandise benefits the Karam Foundation, Distributing Dignity, Planned Parenthood, the Committee to Protect Journalists, and Hispanic Federation. In July 2017, Bee's "Nasty Woman Shirt" campaign raised over $1 million for Planned Parenthood. On August 9, 2017, Bee announced that thanks to Turner and Penguin Books, the show was able to send 10,000 books and coloring books to the Kurdish displaced person camp (Khazir) that they have visited. Full Frontal frequently supports other organizations and causes, including: 2017 Women's March, Girl Scouts of the USA, New Brunswick Today, miamirights.com, Life After Hate, Affordable Care Act (ACA), #MeToo, Time's Up, RAICES, and the National Association for the Advancement of Colored People (NAACP).

On March 11, 2020, Bee announced on that night's episode of Full Frontal that future tapings would proceed without an in-studio audience due to the threat posed by the COVID-19 pandemic. The COVID-19 affected episodes were subtitled Little Show in the Big Woods and were filmed in the woods, with Bee's husband Jason Jones acting as cameraman. When the show returned to studio taping, it began to originate instead in Norwalk, Connecticut; the Connecticut office of Film, Television and Digital Media was credited at the end of each episode.

Cast
Bee served as host and the show had four contributors who appear in field pieces: Michael Rubens (senior field producer), Allana Harkin (co-producer), Amy Hoggart, and Mike Brown. Past contributors include Ashley Nicole Black (writer).

Writers
The show was written by Samantha Bee, Kristen Bartlett (episodes 82–present), Pat Cassels, Sean Crespo (episodes 112-present), Mike Drucker (episodes 69–present), Mathan Erhardt, Joe Grossman, Miles Kahn (episodes 41–present), Sahar Rizvi (episodes 112-present), Nicole Silverberg (episodes 66–present), and Melinda Taub. In December 2017, Taub was promoted to head writer of the show (episode 67–present). Former writers include: Ashley Nicole Black (episodes 1–103), Eric Drysdale (episodes 12–41, 43–105), Travon Free (episodes 41–69), Jo Miller (episodes 1–55), and Jason Reich (episodes 1–31).

Broadcast

In the United States, the first season of Full Frontal with Samantha Bee aired weekly on Mondays at 10:30 p.m. EST on TBS. On November 16, 2016, it was announced that TBS renewed the show for a second season, as well as moving it to Wednesdays at 10:30 p.m. EST, starting January 11, 2017.

In Canada, the show aired on The Comedy Network. In Australia, Full Frontal was broadcast on SBS Viceland. In New Zealand, the show was broadcast on DUKE. In Germany, the show was broadcast on TNT Comedy with German subtitles.

Episodes

Reception
Full Frontal with Samantha Bee was met with critical acclaim. On Rotten Tomatoes, the first season has an approval rating of 100% based on 25 reviews, with an average rating of 8.5/10. The site's critical consensus reads, "Full Frontal with Samantha Bee adds a female perspective to late-night TV – and one that's fresh and funny enough to deserve more than just one show a week." On Metacritic, the first season holds a score of 84 out of 100, based on 16 critics, which constitutes "universal acclaim".

TheWraps Diane Gordon praised the show, saying "With Full Frontal, TBS truly has a comedy show that's sure to become part of the cultural conversation and possibly fill the void felt by Jon Stewart‘s departure. There's so much scathing, insightful, intelligent funny packed into Full Frontal and Bee's ability to land a joke is beyond impressive." Vulture called Full Frontal "a formidable force of political satire. It demands your attention," and the blog named Bee's "Trump Conspiracy Theory" segment as its #1 clip on its list of "The 10 Most Important Late-Night TV Moments in 2016." In March 2017, Wired'''s cultural critic Virginia Heffernan called Full Frontal "the most mercilessly feminist show (ever) (in history)".

ControversiesFull Frontal aired a segment on March 8, 2017, filmed at the Conservative Political Action Conference (CPAC), in which the narrator, correspondent Michael Rubens said Kyle Coddington, a writer for OUTSET magazine, had "Nazi hair". At the time, Coddington was undergoing chemotherapy for brain cancer. The show apologized the next day, saying they were unaware of his condition, and donated to his medical expenses on GoFundMe. Coddington refuses to accept their apology.

On May 30, 2018, Bee ran a segment about the Trump administration's policy of separating children from families of undocumented immigrants at the border. Bee then criticized Ivanka Trump for hypocrisy after Trump tweeted a photo of herself and her child, saying, "Let me just say, one mother to another, do something about your dad's immigration practices, you feckless cunt!" The segment generated controversy. As a result, both Autotrader.com and State Farm pulled their advertising from the show. White House Press Secretary Sarah Huckabee Sanders called on both Turner and TBS to take action. Both Bee and TBS apologized. Accepting a Television Academy Honors award later for Full Frontal''’s #MeToo coverage, Bee said, "Every week I strive to show the world as I see it, unfiltered. Sometimes I should probably have a filter. I accept that. Stories about 1,500 missing unaccompanied migrant children flooded the news cycle over the weekend. So last night we aired a segment on the atrocious treatment of migrant children by this administration and past administrations. Our piece attracted controversy of the worst kind... We spent the day wrestling with the repercussions of one bad word when we all should have spent the day incensed that as a nation we are wrenching children from their parents and treating people legally seeking asylum as criminals. If we are O.K. with that, then really, who are we?"

Awards and nominations

Notes

References

External links

 
 
 
 

 
2016 American television series debuts
2022 American television series endings
2010s American late-night television series
2010s American political comedy television series
2010s American satirical television series
2010s American television news shows
2010s American television talk shows
2020s American late-night television series
2020s American political comedy television series
2020s American satirical television series
2020s American television news shows
2020s American television talk shows
American news parodies
English-language television shows
Political satirical television series
TBS (American TV channel) original programming
Television series by Studio T
Television shows filmed in Connecticut
Television shows filmed in New York City
Television Academy Honors winners